The  is a Japanese visual novel studio under the publisher . Although the company's name is spelled in Japanese using katakana, on the Internet August is known by the slang term . Hazuki and Hachigatsu mean August in Japanese.

Hazuki founded a label named Aria for consumer video games in March 2006. Aria is composed of almost staffs of August. They aim to port PC video games to consumer video games with the original qualities and world views.

Works

August
 Binary Pot (February 22, 2002)
 Princess Holiday (September 27, 2002)
 Tsuki wa Higashi ni Hi wa Nishi ni: Operation Sanctuary (September 26, 2003)
 August Fan Box (August 27, 2004)
 Yoake Mae yori Ruriiro na (September 22, 2005)
 Fortune Arterial (January 25, 2008)
 Yoake Mae yori Ruriiro na -Moonlight Cradle- (February 27, 2009)
 Aiyoku no Eustia (April 28, 2011)
 Daitoshokan no Hitsujikai (January 25, 2013)
 Daitoshokan no Hitsujikai: Hōkago Shippo Days (August 10, 2013)
 Daitoshokan no Hitsujikai: Dreaming Sheep (March 28, 2014)
  (September 23, 2016)

Aria
 Yoake Mae yori Ruriiro na -Brighter than dawning blue- (December 7, 2006)
 PlayStation 2, release by Digital Gain (later Kaga Create)
 Yoake Mae yori Ruriiro na Portable (February 25, 2010)
 PlayStation Portable, released by Kadokawa Shoten
 Fortune Arterial: Akai Yakusoku (cancelled)
 PlayStation 3, released by Kadokawa Shoten

External links
August's official website 
Aria's official website 

Hentai companies
Video game companies of Japan